Terence John Stacey (born 28 September 1936) was an English professional association footballer of the 1960s. He played in the Football League for Plymouth Argyle and Gillingham, making 39 appearances in total.

References

1936 births
Living people
Footballers from Mitcham
English footballers
Association football defenders
Gillingham F.C. players
Plymouth Argyle F.C. players
English Football League players
England amateur international footballers